Below is a list of composers of lute music, ordered by chronology.

16th century

Miguel de Fuenllana (c.1500–1579) (Spain)
Luis de Milán (c.1500–1561) (Spain)
Alonso Mudarra (1508–1580) (Spain)
Diego Pisador (1509–1557) (Spain)
Luis de Narváez (1510–1555) (Spain)
Antonio de Cabezón (1510–1566) (Spain)
Adrian Le Roy (1520–1598) (France)

17th century

Francesco Corbetta (1612–1681) (Italy)
Gaspar Sanz (1640–1710) (Spain)
Robert de Visée (1650–1725) (France)

External links
http://musicated.com/CGCL

Lute